The Ricasoli I government of Italy held office from 12 June 1861 until 3 March 1862, a total of 264 days, or 8 months and 19 days.

Government parties
The government was composed by the following parties:

Composition

References

Italian governments
1861 establishments in Italy
1861 disestablishments in Italy